Anne Rudloe (née Eidemiller, December 24, 1947 – April 27, 2012) was an American marine biologist. She was the co-founder of the Gulf Specimen Marine Laboratory in Panacea, Florida.

Biography
Rudloe was born Anne Eidemiller, December 24, 1947, in Troy, Ohio, and grew up in Hampton, Virginia. In 1971, she married writer and naturalist Jack Rudloe.

She earned a BSc (Biology) at Mary Washington College in 1969.  She received an MSc in oceanography from Florida State University in 1972 for Significant associations of the motile epibenthos of the turtle-grass beds of St. Joseph Bay, Florida. She received a PhD in Marine Biology in 1978 working with William F. Hernkind at Florida State University for Some ecologically significant aspects of the behavior of the horseshoe crab Limulus polyphemus.  She trained at the United States Naval base in Panama City in underwater research and diving techniques in the "Scientists in the Sea" program and was the first woman to complete the program. She was an FSU adjunct professor of biological science. In 1980 she founded the Panacea Institute of Marine Science in Panacea, Florida.  In 1990, she co-founded the Gulf Specimen Marine Laboratory, as a non-profit teaching laboratory of which she was the managing director.

Rudloe published five books, in addition to scientific articles on horseshoe crabs, electric rays, mysid shrimp, and sea turtles. She wrote for a larger audience as well, in publications such as National Geographic, Smithsonian Magazine, Sports Illustrated, Natural History and Audubon. The article "Trouble in Bayou Country" (National Geographic 182 (September 1979): 377–9), which she co-wrote with her husband, is frequently cited in accounts of environmental damage to the Atchafalaya Basin.

Rudloe also studied Zen Buddhism and received INGA (Dharma transmission) to teach as a JDPSN (Jido Pope Sanim) in the Kwan Um School of Zen. She then became the Abbot at the Cypress Tree Zen Center in Tallahassee, Florida. She was a frequent guest contributor for National Public Radio for both her conservation efforts and Zen Buddhism.

She died of colon cancer, April 27, 2012.

Rudloe was posthumously honored by the Environmental Law Institute with the 2014 Education and Outreach/National Wetlands award. In July 2020 Volunteer Florida, awarded GSML a $485,000 grant to build a 2,000-square-foot classroom complex along with a new parking lot. GSML also acquired six lots adjacent to the original site with a land donation from Gene and Nancy Phipps of the Tallahassee Phipps Foundation to house the building and parking lot. The new Anne Rudloe Memorial Education Center will be dedicated to the memory of Anne Rudloe and will be offering new aquaculture classes to local seafood cooking tutorials, and further its mission of educating the community on marine life.

In 2021 the Governing Board for the Northwest Florida Water Management District named Anne Rudloe the 2020 winner of the River and Bay Champion award. “Anne Rudloe’s passion for conservation and education throughout her career earned her national recognition,” said George Roberts, the chairman of the district's governing board. “But her biggest impact may be found in the thousands and thousands of children who learned about marine biology from touring the Marine Lab she founded in Panacea. No doubt, there will be scientists of tomorrow who discovered their own passion for learning thanks to Anne Rudloe’s work.”

Selected works

Butterflies on a sea wind: beginning Zen (2002)
Chicken Wars (fiction, 2006, with Jack Rudloe)
Priceless Florida: natural ecosystems and native species (2004, with E. Whitney and D.B. Means)
Shrimp: the endless quest for pink gold (2010, with Jack Rudloe)
Zen in a Wild Country (2012)
 "The Suwannee, Our Wild and Scenic Rivers" in National Geographic Vol. 152, No. 1, July, 1977 (with Jack Rudloe)

References

1947 births
2012 deaths
People from Wakulla County, Florida
People from Troy, Ohio
People from Hampton, Virginia
Florida State University alumni
University of Mary Washington alumni
American marine biologists
Women marine biologists
Deaths from colorectal cancer
Deaths from cancer in Florida
American Zen Buddhists
Writers from Florida
Writers from Ohio
Writers from Virginia
20th-century American women scientists
20th-century American women writers
20th-century American scientists
American women non-fiction writers
20th-century American non-fiction writers
Scientists from Virginia
21st-century American women